Herbert Taylor Reade  (20 September 1828, Perth, Upper Canada – 23 June 1897, Bath), was a Canadian born recipient of the Victoria Cross, the highest and most prestigious British honour. The award was for gallantry in the face of the enemy.

He became a Doctor of Medicine in 1850, and joined the British Army as an Assistant Surgeon in November of that same year.

Details
He was 28 years old, and a Surgeon in the 61st Regiment (later The Gloucestershire Regiment), British Army during the Indian Mutiny when the following deeds took place during the Siege of Delhi for which he was awarded the VC:

Further information
He later achieved the rank of Surgeon General, and retired in 1887. After his military service, he served as a surgeon to Queen Victoria. Reade is buried at Locksbrook Cemetery, Bath, Somerset, England. His headstone in located in section FJ, Grave 864. The headstone, in the form of a cross, has a carving of the Victoria Cross at the foot of the cross.

The medal
His Victoria Cross is displayed at the Soldiers of Gloucestershire Museum.

References

Location of grave and VC medal (Avon)
Surgeon-General H.B. Reade
 Legion Magazine Article on Herbert Taylor Read
 

Canadian recipients of the Victoria Cross
1828 births
1897 deaths
Indian Rebellion of 1857 recipients of the Victoria Cross
British Army regimental surgeons
People from Perth County, Ontario
Companions of the Order of the Bath
61st Regiment of Foot officers
British Army recipients of the Victoria Cross